Geissorhiza aspera  is a Geissorhiza species found growing in Cape and West Cape, South Africa.

References

External links
 

aspera
Endemic flora of South Africa